Tetrao is a genus of birds in the grouse subfamily known as capercaillies. They are some of the largest living grouse.
It's feathers were used to create the caracteristic hat of the bersaglieri, an Italian ace infantry formation

Taxonomy
The genus Tetrao was introduced in 1758 by the Swedish naturalist Carl Linnaeus in the tenth edition of his Systema Naturae. The genus name is the Latin word for a game bird, probably a black grouse. The black grouse was included by Linnaeus in the genus Tetrao but is now placed in the genus Lyrurus. The type species was designated as the western capercaillie (Tetrao urogallus) by George Robert Gray in 1840.

Species
The genus contains two species:

The fossil record of this genus is extensive:

 Tetrao conjugens (Early Pliocene of C Europe)
 Tetrao rhodopensis (Early Pliocene of Dorkovo, Bulgaria)
 Tetrao partium (Early Pliocene - Early Pleistocene of SE Europe)
 Tetrao macropus (Late Pliocene - Early Pleistocene of Hungary)
 Tetrao praeurogallus (Early - Middle Pleistocene of E Europe)

References

 
Bird genera
 

ru:Тетерева